Udai Manikya II was the Maharaja of Tripura briefly during the mid-18th-century, having laid claim to the throne during a power struggle between his relatives Joy Manikya II and Indra Manikya II.

Life
Originally named Gangadhar Thakur, he was the eldest son of Maharaja Dharma Manikya II. During Dharma's reign, both Gangadhar and his younger brother Gadadhar Thakur were passed over for the naming of Yuvraj (crown prince), possibly due to a quarrel, with the title instead falling to their uncle Chandramani, who later ascended the throne under the name Mukunda Manikya. When the latter was deposed by the Mughals in 1739, Gangadhar was captured alongside Mukunda's sons Bhadramani and Krishnamani.

By 1744, Tripura was in conflict due to a power struggle between Joy Manikya II and Indra Manikya II. Taking advantage of the situation, Gangadhar bribed the Mughal Naib Nazim of Dhaka, Nawazish Muhammad Khan, and secured a fatwa in his favour. He arrived in Comilla with a strong army led by a general named Muhammad Raphie and claimed the throne under the reginal name Udai Manikya. His rule was short however, as Joy's army gave a strong resistance against the invasion, forcing him into submission and driving him out. Udai subsequently died in Dhaka.

References

Kings of Tripura
History of Tripura
Dethroned monarchs